Griggs is an English surname. Notable people with the surname include:

Andy Griggs (born 1973), American country music artist
Bill Griggs (born ?), Australian surgeon and inventor
Billy Griggs (American football) (born 1962), American football player
Chauncey Wright Griggs (1832-1910), American businessman and politician
Clark Robinson Griggs (1824–1915), American politician, mayor of Urbana, Illinois
C. Wilfred Griggs (born ?), American professor of ancient scripture and Egyptologist
 Frederick Landseer Griggs (1876–1938), English etcher and artist
Johanna Griggs (born 1973), Australian swimmer and television presenter
John W. Griggs (1849–1927), American politician, governor of New Jersey
Laurel Griggs (2006–2019), American stage and television actress
Nigel Griggs (born 1949), British musician, brother of Paul Griggs
Orrin Harold Griggs (1883-1958), American lawyer and politician
Paul Griggs (born 1944), British musician, brother of Nigel Griggs
Phil Griggs (1918–1980), English footballer
Robert Fiske Griggs (1881–1962), American botanist and ecologist
Robyn Griggs (1973-2022), American actress
S. David Griggs (1939–1989), United States Navy officer and NASA astronaut
Steve Griggs,  Canadian sports executive
Sutton E. Griggs (1872–1933), American author, Baptist minister, and social activist
William Griggs (disambiguation)
Terry Brandon Griggs (Born 1982), Owner/Operator of Griggs Racing

English-language surnames
Patronymic surnames